Kenji Syed Rusydi Al-Asyraf Bin Syed Ali (born 12 July 1998) is a Singaporean footballer who plays as a goalkeeper for Singapore Premier League club Tanjong Pagar United.

He was named in the 2019 SEA games squad.

Career statistics

Club

Notes

References

1998 births
Living people
Singaporean footballers
Singapore youth international footballers
Association football goalkeepers
Singapore Premier League players
Young Lions FC players
Home United FC players
Tanjong Pagar United FC players